The Blairich River is a river in the Marlborough district of New Zealand. It is a tributary of the Awatere River

See also
List of rivers of New Zealand

References
Land Information New Zealand - Search for Place Names
 Topographical map NZMS 260 sheet: P29

Rivers of the Marlborough Region
Rivers of New Zealand